Agrotis bilitura, the potato cutworm, is a moth of the family Noctuidae. It is found from the Tarapacá Region to the Magallanes Region and the Juan Fernández Islands in Chile, Argentina, Huánuco Region in Peru and Uruguay.

The wingspan is 30–43 mm. Adults are on wing from October to November and in January.

The larvae feed on various plants, including beet, artichoke, cotton, beetroot, onion, cauliflower, asparagus, spinach, kidney bean, tobacco, tomato, clovers, carrot, melon, sweet cucumber, beet and cabbage.

External links
 Noctuinae of Chile

Agrotis
Moths of South America